Bavian may refer to:
Khinnis Reliefs, Assyrian archaeological site in Iraq, also known as Bavian
Bavian, Iran
Bavian (short story collection)